Cédric Gay is a French former professional rugby league footballer who played in the 2000s.

References

1982 births
Living people
French rugby league players
Rugby league hookers
Toulouse Olympique players
France national rugby league team players